Michel Fabrizio
  Héctor Faubel
  Rudi Felgenheier
  Patrick Fernandez
  Virginio Ferrari
  Romolo Ferri
  Jack Findlay
  Jonas Folger
  Marc Fontan
  Bob Foster
  Ted Frend
  Freddie Frith
  Michel Frutschi 
  Frank Fry

 F